Novoromanovo is a rural locality (a selo) and the administrative center of Novoromanovsky Selsoviet, Kalmansky District, Altai Krai, Russia. The population was 3,144 as of 2013. There are 20 streets.

Geography 
Novoromanovo is located 27 km northwest of Kalmanka (the district's administrative centre) by road. Alexandrovka is the nearest rural locality.

References 

Rural localities in Kalmansky District